The 1997 Malaysian motorcycle Grand Prix was the first round of the 1997 Grand Prix motorcycle racing season. It took place on 13 April 1997 at the Shah Alam Circuit.

500 cc classification

250 cc classification

125 cc classification

References

Malaysian motorcycle Grand Prix
Malaysian
Motorcycle Grand Prix